The Evil Eye is an adventure module for the 2nd edition of the Advanced Dungeons & Dragons fantasy role-playing game, published in 1996.

Plot summary
The Evil Eye is divided into six separate episodes, which do not need to be played linearly. The first episode can be set anywhere in any campaign, and serves as a door into the world of Ravenloft and an introduction to the mysterious Vistani. Once in Ravenloft, the player characters meet the principal characters, each of which is pursuing his or her own hidden agenda. The central plot involves Gabrielle Aderre, lord of Invidia, mother of Molocchio. Gabrielle had betrayed her mother and was cursed with her own child's future betrayal as a result. Molocchio has supernatural powers, which will ultimately destroy everything when he reaches maturity. The Vistani need the help of the player characters to stop him. There are also several sub-plots involving themes such as tragic love and serial killers.

Publication history
The Evil Eye was designed by Steve Kurtz, and published by TSR in 1996. The cover art was by Jeff Easley with interior art by Mark Nelson.

Reception
Cliff Ramshaw reviewed The Evil Eye for Arcane magazine, rating it an 8 out of 10 overall. He described The Evil Eye as "Not so much a dungeon bash as an opportunity for strong roleplaying and character interaction", and "the perfect introduction to the Ravenloft campaign world". He felt that the six adventure episodes "all boast a wealth of imaginative and atmospheric detail as well as numerous hooks for developing adventures at tangents to the one described". Ramshaw concluded his review by saying, "The Evil Eye is a splendid scenario, bursting with fascinating characters and plotlines - highly recommended."

References

Ravenloft adventures
Role-playing game supplements introduced in 1996